David Rysdahl is an American actor. He is best known for starring in the fantasy drama film Nine Days (2020) and the thriller film No Exit (2022). He is set to appear in Christopher Nolan's upcoming film Oppenheimer (2023).

Early life and career 
Rysdahl was born to Gigi and Dr. Scott Rysdahl. He has two brothers and a sister. He grew up in New Ulm, Minnesota, where he attended Cathedral High School. After briefly working in public health in Guatemala, he became more interested in acting as a career. He was cast in a stage production of Hamlet at the Great River Shakespeare Festival in Winona, Minnesota. 

After moving to New York, Rysdahl starred in short films. In 2018, he starred in Cathy Yan’s comedy-drama Dead Pigs. In 2020, he appeared in the fantasy drama film Nine Days, and in 2022, he starred in the thriller No Exit. His other credits include the Netflix docuseries The Family and the indie feature The Land of Owls. In 2022, he joined the cast of Christopher Nolan's upcoming film Oppenheimer.

Personal life 
Rysdahl met actress Zazie Beetz at an acting workshop, and began dating around 2014. They are engaged. They started a production company called Sleepy Poppy. Rysdahl lives in Harlem.

Filmography

Film

Television

References

External links 
 

Living people
1987 births
American male film actors
American male television actors
People from New Ulm, Minnesota